Thurnham is a civil parish in Lancaster, Lancashire, England. It contains 37 listed buildings that are recorded in the National Heritage List for England.  Of these, three are listed at Grade I, the highest of the three grades, three are at Grade II*, the middle grade, and the others are at Grade II, the lowest grade.

The parish contains the villages of Upper Thurnham, Lower Thurnham, and Conder Green, and also Glasson Dock and the surrounding settlement.  The Lancaster Canal and its branch to Glasson Dock pass through the parish and associated with these are listed bridges and locks.  Also passing through the parish is the River Conder, and a bridge crossing this is listed.  There are two country houses; these are listed together with structures associated with them.  Most of the parish is rural, and there are some listed farmhouses.  The other listed buildings include the chapter house of the former Cockersand Abbey, two public houses, two churches and associated structures, a milestone, two boundary stones, and two dock buildings.

Key

Buildings

References

Citations

Sources

 

Lists of listed buildings in Lancashire
Buildings and structures in the City of Lancaster